The regulation of artificial intelligence is the development of public sector policies and laws for promoting and regulating artificial intelligence (AI); it is therefore related to the broader regulation of algorithms. The regulatory and policy landscape for AI is an emerging issue in jurisdictions globally, including in the European Union and in supra-national bodies like the IEEE, OECD and others. Since 2016, a wave of AI ethics guidelines have been published in order to maintain social control over the technology. Regulation is considered necessary to both encourage AI and manage associated risks. In addition to regulation, AI-deploying organizations need to play a central role in creating and deploying trustworthy AI in line with the principles of trustworthy AI, and take accountability to mitigate the risks. Regulation of AI through mechanisms such as review boards can also be seen as social means to approach the AI control problem.

Background 
In 2017 Elon Musk called for regulation of AI development. According to NPR, the Tesla CEO was "clearly not thrilled" to be advocating for government scrutiny that could impact his own industry, but believed the risks of going completely without oversight are too high: "Normally the way regulations are set up is when a bunch of bad things happen, there's a public outcry, and after many years a regulatory agency is set up to regulate that industry. It takes forever. That, in the past, has been bad but not something which represented a fundamental risk to the existence of civilization." In response, some politicians expressed skepticism about the wisdom of regulating a technology that is still in development. Responding both to Musk and to February 2017 proposals by European Union lawmakers to regulate AI and robotics, Intel CEO Brian Krzanich has argued that AI is in its infancy and that it is too early to regulate the technology. Instead of trying to regulate the technology itself, some scholars suggested developing common norms including requirements for the testing and transparency of algorithms, possibly in combination with some form of warranty.

Perspectives 
The regulation of artificial intelligence is the development of public sector policies and laws for promoting and regulating AI. Regulation is now generally considered necessary to both encourage AI and manage associated risks. Public administration and policy considerations generally focus on the technical and economic implications and on trustworthy and human-centered AI systems, although regulation of artificial superintelligences is also considered. The basic approach to regulation focuses on the risks and biases of AI's underlying technology, i.e., machine-learning algorithms, at the level of the input data, algorithm testing, and the decision model, as well as whether explanations of biases in the code can be understandable for prospective recipients of the technology, and technically feasible for producers to convey.

There have been both hard law and soft law proposals to regulate AI. Some legal scholars have noted that hard law approaches to AI regulation have substantial challenges. Among the challenges, AI technology is rapidly evolving leading to a "pacing problem" where traditional laws and regulations often cannot keep up with emerging applications and their associated risks and benefits. Some legal scholars have noted that hard law approaches to AI regulation have substantial challenges. Similarly, the diversity of AI applications challenges existing regulatory agencies, which often have limited jurisdictional scope. As an alternative, some legal scholars argue that soft law approaches to AI regulation are promising because soft laws can be adapted more flexibly to meet the needs of emerging and evolving AI technology and nascent applications. However, soft law approaches often lack substantial enforcement potential.

Cason Schmit, Megan Doerr, and Jennifer Wagner proposed the creation of a quasi-governmental regulator by leveraging intellectual property rights (i.e., copyleft licensing) in certain AI objects (i.e., AI models and training datasets) and delegating enforcement rights to a designated enforcement entity.  They argue that AI can be licensed under terms that require adherence to specified ethical practices and codes of conduct. (e.g., soft law principles).

AI regulation could derive from basic principles. A 2020 Berkman Klein Center for Internet & Society meta-review of existing sets of principles, such as the Asilomar Principles and the Beijing Principles, identified eight such basic principles: privacy, accountability, safety and security, transparency and explainability, fairness and non-discrimination, human control of technology, professional responsibility, and respect for human values. AI law and regulations have been divided into three main topics, namely governance of autonomous intelligence systems, responsibility and accountability for the systems, and privacy and safety issues. A public administration approach sees a relationship between AI law and regulation, the ethics of AI, and 'AI society', defined as workforce substitution and transformation, social acceptance and trust in AI, and the transformation of human to machine interaction. The development of public sector strategies for management and regulation of AI is deemed necessary at the local, national, and international levels and in a variety of fields, from public service management and accountability to law enforcement, healthcare (especially the concept of a Human Guarantee), the financial sector, robotics, autonomous vehicles, the military and national security, and international law.

Henry Kissinger, Eric Schmidt, and Daniel Huttenlocher published an joint statement in November 2021 entitled "Being Human in an Age of AI", calling for a government commission to regulate AI.

As a response to the AI control problem 

Regulation of AI can be seen as positive social means to manage the AI control problem, i.e., the need to insure long-term beneficial AI, with other social responses such as doing nothing or banning being seen as impractical, and approaches such as enhancing human capabilities through transhumanism techniques like brain-computer interfaces being seen as potentially complementary. Regulation of research into artificial general intelligence (AGI) focuses on the role of review boards, from university or corporation to international levels, and on encouraging research into safe AI, together with the possibility of differential intellectual progress (prioritizing risk-reducing strategies over risk-taking strategies in AI development) or conducting international mass surveillance to perform AGI arms control. For instance, the 'AGI Nanny' is a proposed strategy, potentially under the control of humanity, for preventing the creation of a dangerous superintelligence as well as for addressing other major threats to human well-being, such as subversion of the global financial system, until a true superintelligence can be safely created. It entails the creation of a smarter-than-human, but not superintelligent, AGI system connected to a large surveillance network, with the goal of monitoring humanity and protecting it from danger." Regulation of conscious, ethically aware AGIs focuses on integrating them with existing human society and can be divided into considerations of their legal standing and of their moral rights. Regulation of AI has been seen as restrictive, with a risk of preventing the development of AGI.

Global guidance 
The development of a global governance board to regulate AI development was suggested at least as early as 2017. In December 2018, Canada and France announced plans for a G7-backed International Panel on Artificial Intelligence, modeled on the International Panel on Climate Change, to study the global effects of AI on people and economies and to steer AI development. In 2019, the Panel was renamed the Global Partnership on AI.

The Global Partnership on Artificial Intelligence was launched in June 2020, stating a need for AI to be developed in accordance with human rights and democratic values, to ensure public confidence and trust in the technology, as outlined in the OECD Principles on Artificial Intelligence (2019). The founding members of the Global Partnership on Artificial Intelligence are Australia, Canada, the European Union, France, Germany, India, Italy, Japan, Rep. Korea, Mexico, New Zealand, Singapore, Slovenia, the USA and the UK. The GPAI Secretariat is hosted by the OECD in Paris, France. GPAI's mandate covers four themes, two of which are supported by the International Centre of Expertise in Montréal for the Advancement of Artificial Intelligence, namely, responsible AI and data governance. A corresponding centre of excellence in Paris, yet to be identified, will support the other two themes on the future of work and innovation, and commercialization. GPAI will also investigate how AI can be leveraged to respond to the Covid-19 pandemic.

The OECD Recommendations on AI were adopted in May 2019, and the G20 AI Principles in June 2019. In September 2019 the World Economic Forum issued ten 'AI Government Procurement Guidelines'. In February 2020, the European Union published its draft strategy paper for promoting and regulating AI.

At the United Nations (UN), several entities have begun to promote and discuss aspects of AI regulation and policy, including the UNICRI Centre for AI and Robotics. In partnership with INTERPOL, UNICRI's Centre issued the report AI and Robotics for Law Enforcement in April 2019 and the follow-up report Towards Responsible AI Innovation in May 2020. At UNESCO's Scientific 40th session in November 2019, the organization commenced a two-year process to achieve a "global standard-setting instrument on ethics of artificial intelligence". In pursuit of this goal, UNESCO forums and conferences on AI were held to gather stakeholder views. A draft text of a Recommendation on the Ethics of AI of the UNESCO Ad Hoc Expert Group was issued in September 2020 and included a call for legislative gaps to be filled. UNESCO tabled the international instrument on the ethics of AI for adoption at its General Conference in November 2021; this was subsequently adopted. While the UN is making progress with the global management of AI, its institutional and legal capability to manage the AGI existential risk is more limited.

Regional and national regulation 

The regulatory and policy landscape for AI is an emerging issue in regional and national jurisdictions globally, for example in the European Union and Russia. Since early 2016, many national, regional and international authorities have begun adopting strategies, actions plans and policy papers on AI. These documents cover a wide range of topics such as regulation and governance, as well as industrial strategy, research, talent and infrastructure.

Canada
The Pan-Canadian Artificial Intelligence Strategy (2017) is supported by federal funding of Can $125 million with the objectives of increasing the number of outstanding AI researchers and skilled graduates in Canada, establishing nodes of scientific excellence at the three major AI centres, developing 'global thought leadership' on the economic, ethical, policy and legal implications of AI advances and supporting a national research community working on AI. The Canada CIFAR AI Chairs Program is the cornerstone of the strategy. It benefits from funding of Can$86.5 million over five years to attract and retain world-renowned AI researchers.
The federal government appointed an Advisory Council on AI in May 2019 with a focus on examining how to build on Canada's strengths to ensure that AI advancements reflect Canadian values, such as human rights, transparency and openness. The Advisory Council on AI has established a working group on extracting commercial value from Canadian-owned AI and data analytics. In 2020, the federal government and Government of Quebec announced the opening of the International Centre of Expertise in Montréal for the Advancement of Artificial Intelligence, which will advance the cause of responsible development of AI. In 2022, the Canadian Federal Government tabled a bill for the Artificial Intelligence and Data Act. In November 2022, Canada has introduced the Digital Charter Implementation Act (Bill C-27), which proposes three acts that have been described as a holistic package of legislation for trust and privacy: the Consumer Privacy Protection Act, the Personal Information and Data Protection Tribunal Act, and the Artificial Intelligence & Data Act (AIDA).

China 

The regulation of AI in China is mainly governed by the State Council of the People's Republic of China's July 8, 2017 "A Next Generation Artificial Intelligence Development Plan" (State Council Document No. 35), in which the Central Committee of the Chinese Communist Party and the State Council of the PRC urged the governing bodies of China to promote the development of AI up to 2030. Regulation of the issues of ethical and legal support for the development of AI is accelerating, and policy ensures state control of Chinese companies and over valuable data, including storage of data on Chinese users within the country and the mandatory use of People's Republic of China's national standards for AI, including over big data, cloud computing, and industrial software. In 2021, China published ethical guidelines for the use of AI in China which state that researchers must ensure that AI abides by shared human values, is always under human control, and is not endangering public safety.

Council of Europe 
The Council of Europe (CoE) is an international organization which promotes human rights democracy and the rule of law and comprises 47 member states, including all 29 Signatories of the European Union's 2018 Declaration of Cooperation on Artificial Intelligence. The CoE has created a common legal space in which the members have a legal obligation to guarantee rights as set out in the European Convention on Human Rights. Specifically in relation to AI, "The Council of Europe's aim is to identify intersecting areas between AI and our standards on human rights, democracy and rule of law, and to develop relevant standard setting or capacity-building solutions". The large number of relevant documents identified by the CoE include guidelines, charters, papers, reports and strategies. The authoring bodies of these AI regulation documents are not confined to one sector of society and include organizations, companies, bodies and nation-states.

European Union 
Most European Union (EU) countries have their own national strategies towards regulating AI, but these are largely convergent. The European Union is guided by a European Strategy on Artificial Intelligence, supported by a High-Level Expert Group on Artificial Intelligence. In April 2019, the European Commission published its Ethics Guidelines for Trustworthy Artificial Intelligence (AI), following this with its Policy and investment recommendations for trustworthy Artificial Intelligence in June 2019. The EU Commission's High Level Expert Group on Artificial Intelligence carries out work on Trustworthy AI, and the Commission has issued reports on the Safety and Liability Aspects of AI and on the Ethics of Automated Vehicles. In 2020 the EU Commission sought views on a proposal for AI specific legislation, and that process is ongoing.

On February 2, 2020, the European Commission published its White Paper on Artificial Intelligence - A European approach to excellence and trust.
The White Paper consists of two main building blocks, an 'ecosystem of excellence' and a 'ecosystem of trust'. The latter outlines the EU's approach for a regulatory framework for AI. In its proposed approach, the Commission differentiates between 'high-risk' and 'non-high-risk' AI applications. Only the former should be in the scope of a future EU regulatory framework. Whether this would be the case could in principle be determined by two cumulative criteria, concerning critical sectors and critical use. Following key requirements are considered for high-risk AI applications: requirements for training data; data and record-keeping; informational duties; requirements for robustness and accuracy; human oversight; and specific requirements for specific AI applications, such as those used for purposes of remote biometric identification. AI applications that do not qualify as 'high-risk' could be governed by a voluntary labeling scheme. As regards compliance and enforcement, the Commission considers prior conformity assessments which could include 'procedures for testing, inspection or certification' and/or 'checks of the algorithms and of the data sets used in the development phase'. A European governance structure on AI in the form of a framework for cooperation of national competent authoritieus could facilitate the implementation of the regulatory framework. A January 2021 draft was leaked online on April 14, 2021, before the Commission ultimately presented their official "Proposal for a Regulation laying down harmonised rules on artificial intelligence (Artificial Intelligence Act)" a week later. Shortly after, the Artificial Intelligence Act was formally proposed. This includes a fine-tune of the 2020 risk-based approach. The proposal has been severely critiqued in the  public debate. Academics are concerned about the various unclear elements in the proposal - such as the broad definition of what constitutes AI - and fear unintended legal implications, especially for vulnerable groups such as patients and migrants.   

Observers have expressed concerns about the multiplication of legislative proposals under the von der Leyen Commission. The speed of the legislative initiatives is partially led by political ambitions of the EU and could put at risk the digital rights of the European citizens, including rights to privacy, especially in the face of uncertain guarantees of data protection through cyber security. Among the stated guiding principles in the variety of legislative proposals in the area of AI under the von der Leyen Commission are the objectives of strategic autonomy and the concept of digital sovereignty.

United Kingdom 
The UK supported the application and development of AI in business via the Digital Economy Strategy 2015-2018, introduced at the beginning of 2015 by Innovate UK as part of the UK Digital Strategy. In the public sector, guidance has been provided by the Department for Digital, Culture, Media and Sport, on data ethics and the Alan Turing Institute, on responsible design and implementation of AI systems. In terms of cyber security, in 2020 the National Cyber Security Centre has issued guidance on 'Intelligent Security Tools'. The following year, the UK published its 10-year National AI Strategy, which describes actions to assess long-term AI risks, including AGI-related catastrophic risks.

United States 
Discussions on regulation of AI in the United States have included topics such as the timeliness of regulating AI, the nature of the federal regulatory framework to govern and promote AI, including what agency should lead, the regulatory and governing powers of that agency, and how to update regulations in the face of rapidly changing technology, as well as the roles of state governments and courts.

As early as 2016, the Obama administration had begun to focus on the risks and regulations for artificial intelligence. In a report titled Preparing For the Future of Artificial Intelligence, the National Science and Technology Council set a precedent to allow researchers to continue to develop new AI technologies with few restrictions. It is stated within the report that "the approach to regulation of AI-enabled products to protect public safety should be informed by assessment of the aspects of risk....". These risks would be the principal reason to create any form of regulation, granted that any existing regulation would not apply to AI technology.

The first main report was the National Strategic Research and Development Plan for Artificial Intelligence. On August 13, 2018, Section 1051 of the Fiscal Year 2019 John S. McCain National Defense Authorization Act (P.L. 115-232) established the National Security Commission on Artificial Intelligence "to consider the methods and means necessary to advance the development of artificial intelligence, machine learning, and associated technologies to comprehensively address the national security and defense needs of the United States." Steering on regulating security-related AI is provided by the National Security Commission on Artificial Intelligence. The Artificial Intelligence Initiative Act (S.1558) is a proposed bill that would establish a federal initiative designed to accelerate research and development on AI for, inter alia, the economic and national security of the United States.

On January 7, 2019, following an Executive Order on Maintaining American Leadership in Artificial Intelligence, the White House's Office of Science and Technology Policy released a draft Guidance for Regulation of Artificial Intelligence Applications, which includes ten principles for United States agencies when deciding whether and how to regulate AI. In response, the National Institute of Standards and Technology has released a position paper, and the Defense Innovation Board has issued recommendations on the ethical use of AI. A year later, the administration called for comments on regulation in another draft of its Guidance for Regulation of Artificial Intelligence Applications.

Other specific agencies working on the regulation of AI include the Food and Drug Administration, which has created pathways to regulate the incorporation of AI in medical imaging.

In March 2021, the National Security Commission on Artificial Intelligence released their final report.  In the report, they stated that "Advances in AI, including the mastery of more general AI capabilities along one or more dimensions, will likely provide new capabilities and applications. Some of these advances could lead to inflection points or leaps in capabilities. Such advances may also introduce new concerns and risks and the need for new policies, recommendations, and technical advances to assure that systems are aligned with goals and values, including safety, robustness and trustworthiness. The US should monitor advances in AI and make necessary investments in technology and give attention to policy so as to ensure that AI systems and their uses align with our goals and values."

In June 2022, Senators Rob Portman and Gary Peters introduced the Global Catastrophic Risk Mitigation Act. The bipartisan bill "would also help counter the risk of artificial intelligence... from being abused in ways that may pose a catastrophic risk". On October 4, 2022, President Joe Biden unveiled a new AI Bill of Rights , which outlines five protections Americans should have in the AI age:  1. Safe and Effective Systems, 2. Algorithmic Discrimination Protection, 3.Data Privacy, 4. Notice and Explanation, and 5. Human Alternatives, Consideration, and Fallback. The Bill was introduced in October 2021 by the Office of Science and Technology Policy (OSTP), a US government department that advises the president on science and technology.

In January 2023, the New York City Bias Audit Law (Local Law 144) was enacted by the NYC Council in November 2021. Originally due to come into effect on 1st January 2023, the enforcement date for Local Law 144 has now been pushed back to 15th April 2023 due to the high volume of comments received during the public hearing on the Department of Consumer and Worker Protection's (DCWP) proposed rules to clarify the requirements of the legislation. From 15th April 2023, companies are prohibited from using automated tools to hire candidates or promote employees, unless the tools have been independently audited for bias. These regulations are likely to affect hundreds of organisations within the city and may include your own.

Brazil 
On September 30, 2021, the Brazilian Chamber of Deputies approved the Brazilian Legal Framework for Artificial Intelligence, Marco Legal da Inteligência Artificial, in regulatory efforts for the development and usage of AI technologies and to further stimulate research and innovation in AI solutions aimed at ethics, culture, justice, fairness, and accountability. This 10 article bill outlines objectives including missions to contribute to the elaboration of ethical principles, promote sustained investments in research, and remove barriers to innovation.  Specifically, in article 4, the bill emphasizes the avoidance of discriminatory AI solutions, plurality, and respect for human rights. Furthermore, this act emphasizes the importance of the equality principle in deliberate decision-making algorithms, especially for highly diverse and multiethnic societies like that of Brazil. 

When the bill was first released to the public, it faced substantial criticism, alarming the government for critical provisions. The underlying issue is that this bill fails to thoroughly and carefully address accountability, transparency, and inclusivity principles. Article VI establishes subjective liability, meaning any individual that is damaged by an AI system and is wishing to receive compensation must specify the stakeholder and prove that there was a mistake in the machine's life cycle. Scholars emphasize that it is out of legal order to assign an individual responsible for proving algorithmic errors given the high degree of autonomy, unpredictability, and complexity of AI systems. This also drew attention to the currently occurring issues with face recognition systems in Brazil leading to unjust arrests by the police, which would then imply that when this bill is adopted, individuals would have to prove and justify these machine errors. 

The main controversy of this draft bill was directed to three proposed principles. First, the non-discrimination principle, suggests that AI must be developed and used in a way that merely mitigates the possibility of abusive and discriminatory practices. Secondly, the pursuit of neutrality principle lists recommendations for stakeholders to mitigate biases; however, with no obligation to achieve this goal. Lastly, the transparency principle states that a system's transparency is only necessary when there is a high risk of violating fundamental rights. As easily observed, the Brazilian Legal Framework for Artificial Intelligence lacks binding and obligatory clauses and is rather filled with relaxed guidelines. In fact, experts emphasize that this bill may even make accountability for AI discriminatory biases even harder to achieve. Compared to the EU's proposal of extensive risk-based regulations, the Brazilian Bill has 10 articles proposing vague and generic recommendations.

Compared to the multistakeholder participation approach taken previously in the 2000s when drafting the Brazilian Internet Bill of Rights, Marco Civil da Internet, the Brazilian Bill is assessed to significantly lack perspective. Multistakeholderism, more commonly referred to as Multistakeholder Governance, is defined as the practice of bringing multiple stakeholders to participate in dialogue, decision-making, and implementation of responses to jointly perceived problems. In the context of regulatory AI, this multistakeholder perspective captures the trade-offs and varying perspectives of different stakeholders with specific interests, which helps maintain transparency and broader efficacy. On the contrary, the legislative proposal for AI regulation did not follow a similar multistakeholder approach. 

Future steps may include, expanding upon the multistakeholder perspective. There has been a growing concern about the inapplicability of the framework of the bill, which highlights that the one-shoe-fits-all solution may not be suitable for the regulation of AI and calls for subjective and adaptive provisions.

Regulation of fully autonomous weapons 

Legal questions related to lethal autonomous weapons systems (LAWS), in particular compliance with the laws of armed conflict, have been under discussion at the United Nations since 2013, within the context of the Convention on Certain Conventional Weapons. Notably, informal meetings of experts took place in 2014, 2015 and 2016 and a Group of Governmental Experts (GGE) was appointed to further deliberate on the issue in 2016. A set of guiding principles on LAWS affirmed by the GGE on LAWS were adopted in 2018.

In 2016, China published a position paper questioning the adequacy of existing international law to address the eventuality of fully autonomous weapons, becoming the first permanent member of the U.N. Security Council to broach the issue, and leading to proposals for global regulation. The possibility of a moratorium or preemptive ban of the development and use of LAWS has also been raised on several occasions by other national delegations to the Convention on Certain Conventional Weapons and is strongly advocated for by the Campaign to Stop Killer Robots – a coalition of non-governmental organizations. The US government maintains that current international humanitarian law is capable of regulating the development or use of LAWS, and the US military does not have LAWS in its inventory.

See also 
 Artificial intelligence
 Artificial intelligence arms race
 AI alignment
 Artificial intelligence in government
 Ethics of artificial intelligence
 Government by algorithm
 Regulation of algorithms

References 

Existential risk from artificial general intelligence
Computer law